Estádio Godofredo Cruz is a multi-use stadium in Campos dos Goytacazes, Brazil. It is used mostly for football matches. The stadium has a maximum capacity of 25,000 people, and it is owned by Americano Futebol Clube.

External links
Templos do Futebol

Godofredo Cruz